Glennon Patrick Flavin (March 2, 1916 – August 27, 1995) was an American prelate of the Roman Catholic Church. He served as bishop of the Diocese of Lincoln in Nebraska from 1967 to 1992.  He previously served as an auxiliary bishop of the Archdiocese of St. Louis in Missouri from 1957 to 1967.

Biography

Early life 
Glennon Flavin was born on March 2, 1916, in St. Louis, Missouri, the youngest of six children. His father was a police lieutenant. His brother Cornelius also joined the priesthood. After graduating from St. Louis Preparatory Seminary, Glennon Flavin studied at Kenrick Seminary in Shrewsbury, Missouri.

Priesthood 
Flavin was ordained a priest by Archbishop John J. Glennon on December 20, 1941. He then served as a curate at St. Michael Church and taught algebra at the Cathedral Latin School in St. Louis. In 1948, he was named assistant director of the archdiocesan Mission Office, becoming its director in 1956. He became a curate at the Cathedral of St. Louis and private secretary to Archbishop Joseph Ritter in 1949.

Auxiliary Bishop of St. Louis 
On April 17, 1957, Flavin was appointed auxiliary bishop of St. Louis and titular bishop of Ioannina by Pope Pius XII. He received his episcopal consecration on May 30, 1957, from Archbishop Ritter, with Bishops Charles Helmsing and Leo Byrne serving as co-consecrators. Flavin selected as his episcopal motto: "Ut Christus Regnet" (Latin: "That Christ may reign").

In addition to his episcopal duties, he became pastor of Our Lady of Lourdes Parish in University City, Missouri, in 1960.

Bishop of Lincoln 
Flavin was named the seventh bishop of the Diocese of Lincoln by Pope Paul VI on May 29, 1967. He greatly increased the number of priestly vocations during his tenure.

Flavin founded the School Sisters of Christ the King in 1976. In 1981, he prohibited women from serving as lectors during Mass; in response, Archbishop Rembert Weakland called his actions "a step backward and offensive."

Retirement and legacy 
After twenty-four years as bishop, Flavin retired on March 24, 1992. Glennon Flavin died from cancer at his residence in Denton on August 27, 1995 at age 79. He is buried in the chapel of the Cathedral of the Risen Christ.

References

1916 births
1995 deaths
Kenrick–Glennon Seminary alumni
Clergy from St. Louis
Roman Catholic Archdiocese of St. Louis
Roman Catholic bishops of Lincoln
20th-century Roman Catholic bishops in the United States
Participants in the Second Vatican Council
Religious leaders from Missouri
Deaths from cancer in Nebraska